Karnataka Rashtra Samithi (KRS) is an Indian political party based in Karnataka.

Mission and Objectives
A powerful regional party centered on Karnataka.

Regional, honest, populist politics.

Political struggle for identity and interest of Kannada Language and Karnataka State.

Struggle to protect the interests of Karnataka by strengthening the union system.

Action for development of a balanced integrated Karnataka by eliminating regional disparities.

Maintenance of internal democracy (primary elections in selection of candidates and office bearers).

Term limit for office bearers; Opportunity for everyone to become a leader and encourage leadership development.

Rejecting royalist style of dynastic politics and creating opportunities for qualified, honest, caring, educated masses to become political leaders.

See also
 Uttama Prajakeeya Party

References

India